Exton Hotel, also known as Exton House and Ship Station, is a historic hotel located in West Whiteland Township, Chester County, Pennsylvania. It was built in 1859, and is a three-story, five-bay, stuccoed-stone building with a full-width porch in the Italianate style.  It has a one-story addition.  For several years it housed a ticket office for the adjacent Chester Valley Railroad.

It was listed on the National Register of Historic Places in 1983.

References

Hotel buildings on the National Register of Historic Places in Pennsylvania
Italianate architecture in Pennsylvania
Hotel buildings completed in 1859
Buildings and structures in Chester County, Pennsylvania
National Register of Historic Places in Chester County, Pennsylvania